Messaoud Belloucif (born 30 November 1940) is an Algerian footballer. He played in 15 matches for the Algeria national football team from 1964 to 1968. He was also named in Algeria's squad for the 1968 African Cup of Nations tournament.

References

External links
 

1940 births
Living people
Algerian footballers
Algeria international footballers
1968 African Cup of Nations players
Competitors at the 1967 Mediterranean Games
Mediterranean Games competitors for Algeria
Place of birth missing (living people)
Association football defenders
21st-century Algerian people
20th-century Algerian people